Josef Šlehofer (29 April 1899 – 1980) was a Czech racewalker. He competed in the men's 10 kilometres walk at the 1920 Summer Olympics.

References

1899 births
1980 deaths
Athletes (track and field) at the 1920 Summer Olympics
Czech male racewalkers
Olympic athletes of Czechoslovakia
Place of birth missing